Chai Rachawat is the pen name of Thai cartoonist Somchai Katanyutanant (born 2 June 1941). One of the most popular and influential cartoonists in Thailand, his best known work is the political cartoon Phuyai Ma kap Thung Ma Moen, which appears in the daily Thai Rath newspaper.

Biography 
Somchai Katanyutanant was born to an ethnic Chinese family in Ubon Ratchathani Province on 19 June  1941. He graduated from Benchama Maharat School and studied at the Bangkok Business College because he wanted to work at the bank. After graduation, he worked at the Bank of Ayudhya. Not so long after he worked at the bank, he then resign from the work due to tiresomeness. Chai had an unusual path that led him to political cartoons. As a boy, he seemed like a perfect prospect to become a political cartoonist, because he had an interest in both politics and drawing cartoons.

Printing industry 
Chai Ratchawat begins his career in art department for Sport magazine name "The game" and start writing about political after the event on October 6, 1976. For the magazine he works for is Thongchai and (. And because of this Chai has to move to Los Angeles and America for 2 years and back to Thailand and keep drawing and also write a story name (in the Daily News and Thai Rath.

Political Role 

Award 
Sriburapha Award in A.D. 2000
ศ.บำรุงสุข สีหอำไพ Award From Communication Arts, Chulalongkorn University in 2008
Thai news report society Award
Award from Rangsit University
Award from Thai cultural committee
ม.ร.ว.อายุมงคล Award from Mahasarakham University in 2003

Work 
Caricature cartoon, published daily in Thairath Newspaper
The Story of Mahajanaka in cartoon edition
The Story of Tongdaeng in cartoon edition
ไทยถลอก(ปอกเปิก)  published by Preaw
สังคมสังคัง  published by Preaw
เด็กชายแตงโม  published by Preaw
ตามประสาการ์ตูนนิสต์  published by Amarin pocket book
หนังสือสื่อสนุกปลุกจินตนาการ by SCG Foundation in 2014

References

Living people
Thai comics artists
Thai cartoonists
Thai political satire
Year of birth missing (living people)